Katherine Baicker (born May 23, 1971) is an American health economist best known for the Oregon Medicaid health experiment. She serves as the dean of the University of Chicago Harris School of Public Policy, and has been announced by university President Paul Alivisatos as the university's next Provost.

Biography
Baicker received her B.A. in Economics from Yale University in 1993 and her Ph.D. in Economics from Harvard University in 1998. She began her academic career teaching economics at Dartmouth College from 1998 to 2005 and her political career in 2001, serving as a senior economist for the President's Council of Economic Advisors. From 2005-2007 she taught public policy at the University of California Los Angeles School of Public Affairs. During this period she rejoined the Council of Economic Advisors as a congressionally confirmed chief economist. In 2007 she moved to Harvard University where she held positions in the Kennedy School of Government and the T.H. Chan School of Public Health until 2017 when she accepted the position of dean at the Harris School of Public Policy at the University of Chicago.

She currently serves on the Editorial Boards of Health Affairs, the Journal of Health Economics, and the Forum for Health Economics and Policy; as Vice Chair of the Board of Directors of AcademyHealth; on the Congressional Budget Office's Panel of Health Advisers; and as a Commissioner on the Medicare Payment Advisory Commission. She is a Director at Eli Lilly and Company.

Research
Her research areas include health economics, welfare, and public finance, with a particular focus on the financing of health insurance, spending on public programs, and fiscal federalism.

She believes in Medicare copayments as a way of reducing medical spending on unnecessary care. Copayments should be limited to a maximum patient contribution, to avoid patients having to pay catastrophic expenses that would defeat the purpose of insurance. Medicare clients should not have to buy supplemental insurance to avoid that risk. But copayments should be low for services that are effective at improving health.

Her research has been published in journals such as Health Affairs, the Journal of Public Economics, and the Quarterly Journal of Economics, and has been featured in the New York Times, the Wall Street Journal, Business Week, and on National Public Radio.  She is currently one of the leaders of a research program investigating the many effects of expanding health insurance coverage in the context of a randomized Medicaid expansion in Oregon.

See also
 Oregon Medicaid health experiment

References

External links
 Home Page at the Harvard School of Public Health

1971 births
21st-century American economists
American women economists
Dartmouth College faculty
Harvard School of Public Health faculty
Harvard Graduate School of Arts and Sciences alumni
Health economists
Harvard Kennedy School faculty
Living people
UCLA Luskin School of Public Affairs faculty
University of Chicago faculty
Yale College alumni
United States Council of Economic Advisers
21st-century American women